"Nah Neh Nah" is a song by Belgian band Vaya Con Dios. It was released in 1990 as the first single from the band's second studio album, Night Owls. 
The music video consists of one single take.

The song has been covered by Italian DJ Rico Bernasconi in 2010, and by German house duo Milk & Sugar in 2011.

Track listings
7" single
"Nah Neh Nah" – 2:52
"Pack Your Memories" – 3:04

12" single
"Nah Neh Nah" – 2:52
"Pack Your Memories" – 3:04
"With You" – 4:02

CD single
"Nah Neh Nah" – 2:52
"Pack Your Memories" – 3:04
"With You" – 4:02

Charts

Weekly charts

Year-end charts

Milk & Sugar vs. Vaya Con Dios version

In late 2010, German house duo Milk & Sugar released a remix version of the song. It became a top 10 hit in Austria, Belgium, Czech Republic, Germany, Netherlands, Slovakia, and Switzerland.

Track listings
Belgian CD single
"Hey (Nah Neh Nah)" – 3:17   	
"Hey (Nah Neh Nah)" (Extended Mix) – 5:13 	
"Hey (Nah Neh Nah)" (Club Mix) – 5:53 	
"Hey (Nah Neh Nah)" (Dub Mix) – 5:23 	

German CD single
"Hey (Nah Neh Nah)" (Milk & Sugar Radio Version) – 3:17 	
"Hey (Nah Neh Nah)" (Milk & Sugar Club Mix) – 5:53

Charts and certifications

Weekly charts

Year-end charts

Certifications

See also
Nyah nyah nyah nyah nyah nyah, a children's taunt.

References

External links
"Nah Neh Nah" at Discogs

1990 singles
Vaya Con Dios (band) songs
2011 singles
Songs written by Dani Klein
1990 songs
Ariola Records singles
Number-one singles in Israel